Pamela London (born 13 September 1973) is Guyanese former professional boxer who competed from 2003 to 2010. She challenged twice for the WIBF heavyweight title in 2004 and 2009.

Career
On 29 August 2003, London made her professional debut, drawing (tying) in four rounds with Geraldine Cox, another promising Guyanese fighter who would later turn into a common opponent for London.

She faced Cox again on her second professional fight, losing a four round unanimous decision on her second fight, held on 1 November.

On 26 December London had her first win, defeating Shelly Gibson by a four round decision in Georgetown.

London began 2004 on 1 February by defeating Shondell Parks by an eight round unanimous decision, once again in Georgetown. After this win, London was ranked among the top ten contenders by the IWBF in the women's Heavyweight category.

On 16 April she beat Krystal Lessey by a unanimous decision, further enhancing her condition as a championship challenger.

Her third bout with Cox came on 21 May, and London earned a title shot by beating Cox, once again by decision.

Her first world title try came on 28 November when she met Martha Salazar for the IWBF's world Heavyweight title. Once again fighting in front of her home-crowd, London lost when she was knocked out in seven rounds by Salazar.

London lost by knockout to Natascha Ragosina in 2009 while contesting for the WIBF world heavyweight title.

Professional boxing record

External links

References

1973 births
Guyanese women boxers
Living people
Heavyweight boxers